Laurent Naud (September 11, 1909 to Sainte-Thècle, Quebec, Canada – March 4, 1992 to Sainte-Thècle) was a Quebec businessman (Canada) operating a lumber factory and a building materials business in Sainte-Thècle. He was married June 24, 1940 in the church of Sainte-Thècle to Madeleine Lafrance. This couple has ten children baptized in Sainte-Thècle. Five generations of the Naud family have marked the history of Sainte-Thècle by their roles in business and merchants.

Alfred Naud 

Alfred Naud (married to Marie Hamelin) who then resided at St-Joseph rank, began in 1878 the operation of a sawmill by harnessing the falls at the head of the river desires at the mouth of Lake Travers. This flour mill was demolished between 1890 and 1898 Alfred Naud became president of the Commission scolaire de Sainte-Thècle on August 28, 1910. He was mayor of Sainte-Thècle from 1899 to 1901.

Alfred established a sawmill on Saint-Gabriel street (near the corner of Saint-Joseph Street), in the village of Sainte-Thècle. A fire completely destroyed this mill in 1911. Alfred Naud had built a residence next to the mill; he operated there for a short time the telephone central of the village.

Pierre Naud 

In 1890, one of their sons, Pierre Naud, opened a window and door workshop on the third floor of his residence on rue Masson in the village below Sainte-Thècle. In 1905, with the business gaining momentum, Pierre Naud then opened a larger workshop by building the workshop next to the house. In 1932, a fire completely destroyed this workshop.

Pierre Naud rebuilds his window and door factory, as well as a carpentry. Subsequently, he set up a shop for the sale of building materials, paint and hardware. Pierre Naud 1869–1939) (Mar. 1: to Delphine Richard, Mar. 2: to Émérentienne Perron) had been in school until the age of eight; he died on April 23, 1939.

Laurent Naud 
Laurent Naud (1909–1992) began working full-time for his father's business at the age of eight. Among his public implications, Laurent Naud was a member for many years in the local fire brigade. He also served for four terms as municipal councilor in the village. He participated in disaster relief at the Canadian Red Cross Society, Grandmother and Region Section.

He was an honorary member of the Commission of the centenary of Sainte-Thècle whose festivities took place in 1973–1974. He was also a founding member of the Knights of Columbus Council 2817 of Sainte-Thècle, founded in 1940. The municipality of Sainte-Thècle has attributed to Laurent Naud the status of "great builder" for his social and business involvement. The municipality has given him a toponymic designation "promenade Laurent Naud" which starts from Lacordaire Street and goes along Lac Croche.

Following the death of his father, Laurent Naud (son of Pierre Naud and Émérentienne Perron) then took over the company which will retain the name of Pierre Naud Enr. The company then expanded regionally by serving the Shawinigan and La Tuque markets. In addition, the company is engaged in the construction of houses, schools, logging camps and general renovation. Pierre Naud Enr was the general contractor having built in 1954 Masson College in Sainte-Thècle.

In 1950, the company started a mill for sawing, sawing and planing wood, a kiln and warehouses. In the 1970s, the company built two new warehouses of materials. The company employed between 40 and 50 full-time employees, including machine tool people, carpenters, delivery men and clerks. The company had a large lumber yard (between the Lac des Chicots and the Masson street), various warehouses to store the cladding materials, a wood workshop where the famous openings were made "Piernaud" and a shop in the service of the builder.

In 1973, 25 motorized units were required to operate all the machines of the manufacture. The company was then using six trucks for the delivery and handling of the wood. The workshop and the trade then required a million and a half linear feet of wood per year. Major industrial customers included Consolidated Bathurst and C.I.P.

The company "Pierre Naud inc" obtained its letters patent on November 25, 1964 and establishes its head office at 281 rue Masson, Sainte-Thècle. This corporation was founded by Laurent Naud, industrialist, his wife Madeleine Lafrance, housewife and Pierre Naud, student. Two brothers of Laurent, Minville and Célien, worked in this company.

Jacques Naud and Michel Lebel 
Laurent Naud retired in 1977. His son Jacques Naud and his son-in-law Michel Lebel continued to run the business. That same year, the company upgraded the window and planing mills. In 1979, a second branch was added to the company to serve the La Tuque area.

In 2006, Marc-André Lebel, son of Michel Lebel joins the team. In 2007 and 2011, the company renovated the Shawinigan and La Tuque stores. Then the company modernizes the Sainte-Thècle window and door factory and the store.

In 1991, Pierre Naud acquired a store in Shawinigan-Sud. The expansion continues in 2012 with the acquisition of a BMR store on boulevard des Récollets in Trois-Rivières. The company then invests $200,000 for the expansion of this store and its modernization. The company inaugurates the largest SICO paint center in the Mauricie region with the most complete range of products.

In 2015, Pierre Naud Inc. celebrated its 125th anniversary. An investment of $100,000 at the Sainte-Thècle window and door mill allows the purchase of state-of-the-art equipment. Pierre Naud inc becomes the oldest hardware store in Quebec.

In 2018, two new branches are added to the large family of Lac-aux-Sables and Saint-Ubalde. In the same year, the window and door factory was restructured, involving the transfer of the Shawinigan and Sainte-Thècle mill to Lac Saint-Jean. The company is then called Fusion doors and windows.

References 

1909 births
People from Mauricie
1992 deaths
Businesspeople from Quebec
Family history